The 2006–07 network television schedule for the six major English language commercial broadcast networks in the United States. The schedule covers prime time hours from September 2006 through August 2007. The schedule is followed by a list per network of returning series, new series, and series cancelled after the 2005–06 season.

PBS is not included; member stations have local flexibility over most of their schedules and broadcast times for network shows may vary.

The schedules include the four most popular networks (CBS, ABC, NBC, and Fox) and two new networks introduced as part of the broadcast TV realignment: The CW and MyNetworkTV.

New series are highlighted in bold.

All times are U.S. Eastern and Pacific Time (except for some live sports or events). Subtract for one hour for Central, Mountain, Alaska and Hawaii-Aleutian times.

Each of the 30 highest-rated shows is listed with its rank and rating as determined by Nielsen Media Research.

Legend

Sunday

Monday

Note: Drive premiered on Fox on April 16, 2007 at 8 p.m. and was removed from the schedule after airing two episodes.

Tuesday

Note: Pirate Master aired at 10 p.m. ET on CBS on June 10 and 17, 2007 and was removed from the schedule after airing two episodes.
Note: Fast Cars and Superstars: The Gillette Young Guns Celebrity Race aired at 8 p.m. ET on ABC on June 12 and 19, 2007.

Wednesday

NOTES: Fox premiered The Rich Li$t on November 1, 2006 at 9PM ET. Due to low ratings, the show was cancelled two days later.

ABC premiered The Great American Dream Vote at 8PM ET on March 28, 2007 (after airing the pilot the previous night). The show was cancelled on March 29, 2007.

Anchorwoman aired two back-to-back episodes on August 22, 2007 on Fox. The show was cancelled a few days later.

Thursday

NOTES: In May 2006, when ABC announced their fall lineup for the 2006-2007 TV season, Big Day and Notes from the Underbelly was scheduled to air at 8PM and 8:30PM ET. However, due to both shows not getting "buzz" before their fall premieres, ABC moved Ugly Betty from its planned Friday night 8PM slot to the Thursday night 8PM ET slot. Big Day and Notes from the Underbelly aired later on in the season on different nights.

Fast Cars and Superstars debuted June 7 on ABC as a lead-in to coverage of the 2007 NBA Finals.

Friday

NOTE: In May 2006, when ABC announced their fall lineup for the 2006-2007 TV season, Big Day and Notes from the Underbelly was scheduled to air at 8PM and 8:30PM ET for Thursday nights and Ugly Betty at 8PM ET Friday nights time slot. However, before their fall premieres, ABC moved Ugly Betty from its planned Friday night 8PM slot to the Thursday night 8PM ET slot. The Friday night 8PM time slot was filled with the previous night's episode of Grey's Anatomy until December.

Saturday

By network

ABC

Returning series
20/20
ABC Saturday Movie of the Week
According to Jim
America's Funniest Home Videos
American Inventor
The Bachelor
Boston Legal
Dancing with the Stars
Desperate Housewives
Extreme Makeover: Home Edition
George Lopez
Grey's Anatomy
Lost
Primetime
Supernanny
What About Brian
Wife Swap
The Wonderful World of Disney

New series
Big Day
Brothers & Sisters
Day Break *
The Ex-Wives Club
Fast Cars and Superstars *
Fat March *
The Great American Dream Vote *
Help Me Help You
i-Caught *
In Case of Emergency *
Just for Laughs *
The Knights of Prosperity *
Masters of Science Fiction *
Men in Trees
National Bingo Night *
The Next Best Thing *
The Nine
Notes from the Underbelly *
October Road *
Saturday Night Football
Set for Life *
Shaq's Big Challenge *
Show Me the Money *
Six Degrees
Traveler *
Ugly Betty

Not returning from 2005-06:
Alias
Commander in Chief
Crumbs
Emily's Reasons Why Not
The Evidence
Freddie
Hope & Faith
Hot Properties
How to Get the Guy
In Justice
Invasion
Jake in Progress
Kyle XY
Less than Perfect
Master of Champions
Miracle Workers
Monday Night Football (moved to ESPN, returned to ABC in 2021-22)
Night Stalker
The One: Making a Music Star
One Ocean View
Rodney
Sons & Daughters

CBS

Returning series
48 Hours
60 Minutes
The Amazing Race
Big Brother
Close to Home
Cold Case
Criminal Minds
CSI: Crime Scene Investigation
CSI: Miami
CSI: NY
Ghost Whisperer
How I Met Your Mother
The King of Queens
NCIS
The New Adventures of Old Christine
Numbers
Survivor
Two and a Half Men
The Unit
Without a Trace

New series
3 lbs *
Armed and Famous *
The Class
Creature Comforts *
Jericho
Pirate Master *
Power of 10 *
Rules of Engagement *
Shark
Smith

Not returning from 2005-06:
CBS Sunday Movie (returned and revived for 2019–20)
Courting Alex
Gameshow Marathon
Love Monkey
Out of Practice
Still Standing
Threshold
Tuesday Night Book Club
Yes, Dear

The CW

Returning series
7th Heaven (The WB)
All of Us (UPN)
America's Next Top Model (UPN)
Beauty and the Geek (The WB)
Everybody Hates Chris (UPN)
Gilmore Girls (The WB)
Girlfriends (UPN)
One Tree Hill (The WB)
Reba (The WB)
Smallville (The WB)
Supernatural (The WB)
Veronica Mars (UPN)
WWE SmackDown (UPN)

New series
The Game
Hidden Palms *
Pussycat Dolls Present *
Runaway

Not returning from 2005–06:
The Bedford Diaries (The WB)
Blue Collar TV (The WB)
Charmed (The WB)
Cuts (UPN)
Eve (UPN)
Everwood (The WB)
Get This Party Started (UPN)
Half & Half (UPN)
Just Legal (The WB)
Living with Fran (The WB)
Love, Inc. (UPN)
Modern Men (The WB)
One on One (UPN)
Pepper Dennis (The WB)
Related (The WB)
Sex, Love & Secrets (UPN)
South Beach (UPN)
Survival of the Richest (The WB)
Twins (The WB)
What I Like About You (The WB)

Fox

Returning series
24
America's Most Wanted
American Dad!
American Idol
Bones
COPS
Family Guy
Hell's Kitchen
House
King of the Hill
The Loop
Nanny 911
The O.C.
Prison Break
The Simpsons
Trading Spouses
The War at Home

New series
Are You Smarter than a 5th Grader? *
Celebrity Duets
Don't Forget the Lyrics! *
Drive *
Happy Hour
Justice
On the Lot *
The Rich List
Standoff
'Til Death
Vanished
The Wedding Bells *
The Winner *

Not returning from 2005–06:
Arrested Development (revived and returned in 2013 on Netflix)
The Bernie Mac Show
Free Ride
Head Cases
Killer Instinct
Kitchen Confidential
Malcolm in the Middle
Reunion
Skating with Celebrities
Stacked
That '70s Show
Unan1mous

MyNetworkTV

New series
American Heiress
Desire
Fashion House
International Fight League
Saints & Sinners *
Watch Over Me
Wicked Wicked Games

NBC

Returning series
America's Got Talent
The Apprentice
The Biggest Loser
The Contender
Crossing Jordan
Dateline NBC
Deal or No Deal
ER
Las Vegas
Last Comic Standing
Law & Order
Law & Order: Special Victims Unit
Law & Order: Criminal Intent
Medium
Most Outrageous Moments
My Name Is Earl
NBC Sunday Night Football (Moved from ESPN)
The Office
Scrubs

New series
1 vs. 100
30 Rock
Age of Love *
Andy Barker, P.I. *
The Black Donnellys *
Friday Night Lights
Grease: You're the One That I Want! *
Heroes
Identity *
Kidnapped
Raines *
The Real Wedding Crashers *
The Singing Bee *
Studio 60 on the Sunset Strip
Thank God You're Here *
Twenty Good Years

Not returning from 2005–06:
The Apprentice: Martha Stewart
The Book of Daniel
Celebrity Cooking Showdown
Conviction
E-Ring
Fear Factor (revived and returned in 2011–12 for one season)
Four Kings
Heist
Inconceivable
Joey
Law & Order: Trial By Jury
Surface
Teachers
Thick & Thin
Three Wishes
Treasure Hunters
The West Wing
Will & Grace (revived and returned in 2017–18)
Windfall

Note: The * indicates that the program was introduced in midseason.

Pickups and cancellations

Full season pickups

ABC
20/20
According to Jim
America's Funniest Home Videos

CBS
Jericho
Shark
Rules of Engagement

The CW
The Game
7th Heaven
One Tree Hill
Veronica Mars

Fox
'Til Death
Standoff

NBC
Heroes
Studio 60 on the Sunset Strip
30 Rock
Friday Night Lights

Canceled or ended
ABC
The Nine
Help Me Help You
Day Break
Show Me the Money
The Knights of Prosperity
The Great American Dream Vote
Six Degrees
In Case of Emergency
What About Brian
George Lopez

CBS
Smith
The King of Queens
Armed & Famous
The Class
Close to Home
3 lbs
Waterfront - cancelled before it aired

Fox
Happy Hour
The Rich List
Vanished
Justice
The O.C.
The Wedding Bells
Drive
Standoff
The Winner

NBC
Kidnapped
Twenty Good Years
The Black Donnellys
Andy Barker, P.I.
The Real Wedding Crashers
Crossing Jordan
Studio 60 on the Sunset Strip
Thank God You're Here
Raines
Identity
Grease: You're the One That I Want!
The Singles Table (Canceled before it aired any episodes)

The CW
Runaway
Reba
7th Heaven
Gilmore Girls
Veronica Mars
All of Us

MyNetworkTV
Desire
Fashion House
Wicked Wicked Games
Watch Over Me
American Heiress
Saints & Sinners

Footnotes

United States primetime network television schedules
United States Network Television Schedule, 2006 07
United States Network Television Schedule, 2006 07